The Saudi Arabian Basketball Federation is the governing body of basketball in Saudi Arabia.

The federation founded in 1964, represents basketball with public authorities as well as with national and international sports organizations and as such with Saudi Arabia in international competitions. It also defends the moral and material interests of Basketball in Saudi Arabia. It is affiliated with FIBA and FIBA Asia.

The federation also in control with  the Saudi Arabia national basketball team, 3x3 national team and the Saudi Arabia women's national basketball team.

Structure
 Dr Ghassan Tashkandi, President
 Yassar Mukhtar, Vice President
 Homoud Al Malki, Board Member
 Aljawhara Fallatah, Board Member
 Mohammed Al Zain, Board Member
 Dareen Sabban, Board Member
 Abdulelah Bin Sail, Executive Manager

Committees
 Competitions and Statistics Committee 
 Technical Committee
 3x3 Committee
 Referees Committee
 Public affairs and Mass Participation Committee
 Media Committee
 Strategic Committee
 Women Affairs Committee
 Players Committee
 Discipline Committee
 Appeal Committee

Competitions
Saudi Basketball League
 SBF Cup
 3x3 Cup

External links 

Official website of the Saudi Arabian Basketball Federation
Saudi Arabia national basketball team
FIBA Profile

References 

1964 establishments in Saudi Arabia
Basketball in Saudi Arabia
Basketball governing bodies in Asia
Sports organizations established in 1964